Azim Hussein is an Indo-Fijian educationalist and politician who won the Nasinu Rewa Open Constituency for the Labour Party in 2006 general election defeating the John Ali of Soqosoqo Duavata ni Lewenivanua (SDL), who had formerly held the seat as a Labour Party candidate.

Hussein had been a primary school head teacher before joining politics.

References 

Fiji Labour Party politicians
Indian members of the House of Representatives (Fiji)
Fijian Muslims
Living people
Fijian educators
Politicians from Nasinu
20th-century Fijian educators
21st-century Fijian educators
Year of birth missing (living people)